Assisi Cathedral ( or Cattedrale di San Rufino di Assisi), dedicated to San Rufino (Rufinus of Assisi) is a major church in Assisi, Italy. This stately church in Umbrian Romanesque style was the third church built on the same site to contain the remains of bishop Rufinus of Assisi, martyred in the 3rd century. The construction was started in 1140 to the designs by Giovanni da Gubbio, as attested by the wall inscription visible inside the apse. He may be the same Giovanni who designed the rose-window on the façade of Santa Maria Maggiore in 1163.

The cathedral has been important in the history of the Franciscan order. In this church Saint Francis of Assisi (1182), Saint Clare (1193), and many of their original disciples were baptised. It was on hearing Francis preaching in this church in 1209 that Clare became deeply touched by his message and realized her calling. Tommaso da Celano related that once Saint Francis was witnessed praying in this church while, at the same time, he was seen jumping on a chariot of fire in the Porziuncola. In 1228, while he was in Assisi for the canonization of Saint Francis, Pope Gregory IX consecrated the high altar. Pope Innocent IV inaugurated the finished church in 1253.

As of 1986 it is a co-cathedral of the Roman Catholic Diocese of Assisi-Nocera Umbra-Gualdo Tadino.

Façade 
The Romanesque façade was built with stones from the Monte Subasio. It is a typical example of the style found in 12th-century churches of Umbria. This façade is divided in three sections. The rather bare top level is triangular with an empty semi-circular arch in the middle, probably intended to contain a frieze or a mosaic.

The middle level is divided by two pilasters, in line with the arch in the upper level. Each of the bay thus delineated contains a rose window, the central one the largest and the most ornate. Its frame is supported by three telamones, each standing on an animal. In the four spandrels around the rose window are the four animal symbols of the four evangelists.

The lower level consists of a number of squares and three decorated stone portals with griffins at the base of the side portals. Especially the middle portal is extensively decorated. In the lunette of the semi-circular arch over the central portal is a relief with the Christ enthroned between the sun and the moon and flanked by the Virgin, also enthroned and nursing Jesus, and St. Rufinus. The portal is surrounded with three arches decorated with saints, floral and geometrical motifs and intertwined swans. At the base of the middle arch, on each side, is a lion. These sculptures of lions and griffins have great iconographic importance.

The bottom and the middle part of the square bell tower, on the left side of the façade, were built in the 11th century. It was then situated behind the apse of the previous church built by bishop Ugone in 1029. The top level dates from the 13th century. One can see on the bell tower a colossal one-handed liturgical clock showing the 24 hours of the hora italica (Italian time), a period of time ending with sunset at 24 hours. The  foundations of the bell tower rest on a Roman cistern. The structure on the side of the bell tower has been identified as the home of St. Clare.

Interior 

In 1571 the interior of the cathedral, originally Romanesque in style, was completely modified in late Renaissance style by the architect Gian Galeazzo Alessi from Perugia. It consists of a central nave, two aisles, separated by massive pillars, an apse and a dome.

In the interior, at the baptismal font at the beginning of the right aisle, Saint Francis was baptised in 1182 and Saint Clare in 1193, as were many of their original followers, and in 1838 Saint Gabriel of Our Lady of Sorrows. The font was fashioned from an ancient granite column and is girdled by an iron grating. The terracotta tabernacle was a present in 1882 on the occasion of the 700th anniversary of Saint Francis's birth.

On the right aisle is the Chapel of the Blessed Sacrament in Baroque style (begun in 1541 and enlarged in 1663), partly frescoed in 1663 by the local painter Giacomo Giorgetti, a pupil of Giovanni Lanfranco. The nine wall paintings are attributed to the 17th-century painter Andrea Carlone.

The Chapel of Our Lady of Consolation was built in 1496 as a consequence of a miracle. In 1494 people had seen the image of Our Lady of Sorrows weeping over the Christ in her arms. This German terracotta sculpture from the early 15th century has recently been stolen.  An identical wooden copy now stands at the same place.

The 19th-century main altar stands under the octagonal Renaissance crossing dome over the remains of Saint Rufinus. On both sides stand the marble statues of Saint Francis and Saint Clare by Giovanni Duprè. In the apse stands the majestic choir, with 22 stalls, decorated with wooden carvings by Giovanni di Pier Jacopo da San Severino (1520). The statue of Saint Rufinus by Lemoyne stands at the center of the choir.

There are several paintings by Dono Doni: Christ adored by Saints (1555); on the two altars on both sides of the major one, there are two more works: Deposition (1562) and Crucifixion (1563).

Under the cathedral there is a crypt with the pagan Roman sarcophagus from the 3rd century, asserted to have once contained the remains of Saint Rufinus. It bears across its front, as many sarcophagi do, a bas-relief with the myth of Diana and Endymion, offering a pagan vision of tranquil afterlife. Here are also the Pozzo della Mensa, a medieval well, and the ruins of a Carolingian cloister from the 10th century.

Museo del Duomo
The Museo Diocesano e Cripta di San Rufino (Museum of the Cathedral and Crypt of San Rufino) was opened in 1941. It contains the following works associated with the cathedral:

 Front of 3rd century AD Roman sarcophagus con Nikai Clipeofore e a libation scene. 
 Detached frescoes of Mary and Christ by the Master of Saint Clare (last quarter of the 13th century).
 Detached frescoes on Passion and Crucifixion by Puccio Capanna (1334), once in the Oratory of San Rufinuccio. 
 Processional standards of the Confraternity di San Francesco e San Leonardo (1378) by the Master of the Gonfalone di San Leonardo. 
 Reliquary containing wood from the 'true cross' (second half of the 15th century), in gilded gold.
 Polyptych of the Story of San Rufino (1462) by Niccolò Alunno.
 Aedicule of the Confraternity of the SS. Sacramento (c. 1475); detached frescoes by Matteo da Gualdo.
 Predella in two leaves (1563) by Dono Doni, depicting St. Gregory Magnus and St. Lawrence.
 Processional standards of the Confraternity of Santa Caterina d’Alessandria (1627) by Orazio Riminaldi.
 'Dying San Francis blesses the city of Assisi' (1640), canvas by Cesare Sermei, originally in the Palazzo Vescovile.
 Processional standards of the Confraternity of San Lorenzo (1673) by Giovanni Andrea Carlone.
 Other works by Pace di Bartolo, Giovanni di Pieriacopo da San Severino, Lorenzo Doni, Raffaello Coda e Girolamo Marinelli.
 Liturgical documents and equipment from the 17th century to present.
 The Frederick Mason Perkins collection composed of 32 works including Giovanni Boccati, Jacopo della Quercia, Filippo Lippi, Francesco di Giorgio Martini, and Giovanni Santi.

See also
Cathedral architecture

Notes

External links

Umbria.org: Cathedral of S. Rufino
Official website

Roman Catholic cathedrals in Italy
Cathedral
12th-century Roman Catholic church buildings in Italy
Cathedrals in Umbria